Alexander Mikhailovich Yelesin (born 7 February 1996) is a Russian professional ice hockey defenceman for Lokomotiv Yaroslavl of the Kontinental Hockey League (KHL).

Playing career
Yelesin played as a youth within the Lokomotiv Yaroslavl program, joining the club to play at the under-16 level. He progressed his development, playing with a junior affiliate, Loko Yaroslavl, in the MHL. He scored 15 points in 63 games over three seasons with Loko, culminating in a championship title in 2015–16.

He made his professional debut during the 2015–16 season, playing with the second-tier club, HC Ryazan of the Supreme Hockey League (VHL). He split the year between Ryazan and the MHL and finished with 5 points in 22 games in the VHL.

On 1 July 2016, Yelesin was traded by Lokomotiv to Amur Khabarovsk in exchange for financial compensation. He made his debut for Amur in the Kontinental Hockey League during the 2016–17 season. He was scoreless with 11 minutes time on ice in a 2-1 shootout victory of CSKA Moscow on 29 September 2016. As a defensive defenseman, Yelesin appeared in 22 games over the duration of the season, attributed with one assist.

On 16 May 2017, after a single season with Amur Khabarovsk, Yelesin was returned in a trade to Lokomotiv Yaroslavl.

In his second season with Lokomotiv in 2018–19, having established his role within the blueline, Yelesin's defensive abilities were noticed as he was selected to represent Lokomotiv at the 2019 KHL All-Star Game. In his first full season, Yelesin contributed 4 goals and 10 points in 55 regular season games. He was scoreless in 10 post-season games as Lokomotiv reached the Western Conference Semi-finals.

Undrafted and out of contract with Lokomotiv, Yelesin opted to pursue an NHL career, signing a two-year, entry-level contract with the Calgary Flames on 11 May 2019. In the following  season, Yelesin made his NHL debut for the Calgary Flames against the Los Angeles Kings on 12 February 2020. He featured in 4 games, with the Flames going scoreless.

After the conclusion of his contract with the Flames, having primarily played with AHL affiliate, the Stockton Heat, Yelesin left as an impending restricted free agent to return to former Russian club Lokomotiv Yaroslavl of the KHL on a one-year contract on 17 June 2021.

International play

On 23 January 2022, Yelesin was named to the roster to represent Russian Olympic Committee athletes at the 2022 Winter Olympics.

Career statistics

Regular season and playoffs

International

Awards and honours

References

External links

1996 births
Living people
Amur Khabarovsk players
Amurskie Tigry players
Calgary Flames players
Loko Yaroslavl players
Lokomotiv Yaroslavl players
Russian ice hockey defencemen
HC Ryazan players
Sokol Krasnoyarsk players
Sportspeople from Yaroslavl
Stockton Heat players
Undrafted National Hockey League players
Ice hockey players at the 2022 Winter Olympics
Medalists at the 2022 Winter Olympics
Olympic silver medalists for the Russian Olympic Committee athletes
Olympic medalists in ice hockey
Olympic ice hockey players of Russia